Cuatro Vientos is a station on Line 10 of the Madrid Metro. It is located in fare Zone A.

The station has two levels, with the surface level serving the C-5 Cercanías line.

References 

Line 10 (Madrid Metro) stations
Railway stations in Spain opened in 2003